George Dolenz (born Jure Dolenc; akas: Giorgio Dolenz and George Dolentz; January 5, 1908  February 8, 1963) was an American film actor born in Trieste (then part of Austria-Hungary, now  Italy), in the city's Slovene community.

Biography
Under the name Giorgio Dolenz (Slovene: Jure Dolenc), he emigrated to the United States via Cuba, arriving by steamship at the port of Key West, Florida in October 1934. By 1937, Dolenz was in Hollywood and working as a waiter. After appearing in small parts in B movies, he graduated to supporting roles. Following the end of World War II, Dolenz became a leading man under contract to RKO Pictures under Howard Hughes. However, the failure of the feature film Vendetta in 1950 resulted in his return to character and supporting parts for other studios, including MGM's The Last Time I Saw Paris as the husband of Donna Reed's character.

He was cast as the star of the 1956 ITC Entertainment 39-episode television series The Count of Monte Cristo as title character3 Edmond Dantes.

On April 21, 1958, Dolenz played Count Peter Von Gilsa in the episode "The Outlander" of the NBC Western television series The Restless Gun.

In 1959, he portrayed Colonel Gutterez in "The Town Is a Prisoner" episode of the NBC Western series Cimarron City.

Dolenz played Juan Amontillo in the 1961 episode "The Uncourageous" of the ABC Western series The Rebel. That same year, he played Ramon Ortega in the "Brand of Honesty" episode of the NBC Western series The Deputy.

Dolenz married actress Janelle Johnson and they had four children: actor and singer Micky Dolenz (George Michael Dolenz) of the 1960s musical band the Monkees, Gemma "Coco" Dolenz, Gina Dolenz and Debbie Dolenz. 

Dolenz died of a heart attack in 1963 at the age of 55. He is interred at Forest Lawn Memorial Park in Glendale, California.

Partial filmography

References

External links

 
 New York Times Movies

1908 births
1963 deaths
Actors from Trieste
American male film actors
American male television actors
American people of Slovenian descent
Austro-Hungarian emigrants to the United States
Burials at Forest Lawn Memorial Park (Glendale)
Male actors from Los Angeles
RKO Pictures contract players
20th-century American male actors
Dolenz family